Football Club Anzhi Makhachkala, known simply as FC Anji, was a Russian professional football club based in the Dagestani capital of Makhachkala. Founded in 1991, the club last competed in the third-tier Russian Football National League 2.

In January 2011, Anzhi Makhachkala was purchased by billionaire Suleyman Kerimov, and subsequently made numerous high-profile signings, including those of striker Samuel Eto'o and defender Roberto Carlos. Following severe budget cuts ahead of the 2013–14 Russian Premier League season, the club lost most of its key players and went on to finish bottom of the table, which resulted in relegation to the Russian National Football League at the end of the season.

History
The club was founded in 1991 by former Dinamo Makhachkala player Aleksandr Markarov with the head of Dagnefteprodukt – Magomed-Sultan Magomedov and took part in its first season in the Dagestan League the same year. The club's name Anzhi means pearl in local Kumyk language and is a former name of Makhachkala. FC Anzhi ended up as league champions with an unbeaten record and 16 wins out of 20 matches.

Due to the dissolution of the Soviet Union, the club entered Zone 1 of the Russian Second Division (the third-highest tier) in 1992 and finished in fifth place. The club won their Group in 1993, but due to league reorganisation were not promoted, and remained in the new Western Zone of the third tier until a second-place finish in 1996 guaranteed promotion to the First Division, under the coaching of Eduard Malofeev. A key player in Anzhi's early history was Azerbaijani international forward Ibragim Gasanbekov, who was the team's top scorer in all of their first seven seasons. He was the league's top scorer in 1993 (30 goals) and 1996 (33 goals).

In 1999, Anzhi won the First Division, and were thus promoted to the top-flight Premier League for the first time. The side missed out on a bronze-medal finish on the last day of the season, as they conceded a last-minute Torpedo Moscow penalty which took their opponents into third place. On 20 June 2001, the club played in the final of the Russian Cup for the first time, losing to Lokomotiv Moscow on penalties after a 1–1 draw.

Anzhi finished 15th and were relegated from the Premier League in 2002, but during their first season back in the First Division, they reached the semi-finals of the Russian Cup, where they lost 1–0 to Rostov. In their seventh season in the First Division, Anzhi won the league and returned to the Premier League. On 5 December 2010, defender Shamil Burziyev died in a car accident at the age of 25.

Purchase

On 18 January 2011, the club was purchased by Dagestani billionaire Suleyman Kerimov, but later it was revealed that the President of Dagestan, Magomedsalam Magomedov, met Kerimov and gave him a 100% stake in the club, including 50% of the shares of the former owner of the club Igor Yakovlev, in exchange for financial support. Kerimov was planning to invest over $200 million in infrastructure, of which a substantial amount would go into building a new stadium with a capacity of more than 40,000 spectators, which would meet all UEFA requirements.

Kerimov's investment was immediate as the club made many signings in the 2011 winter transfer window. The first significant signing came on 16 February, when the club announced the free transfer of Brazilian left-back and 2002 FIFA World Cup winner Roberto Carlos from Corinthians. Further signings included Roberto Carlos's teammate at Corinthians, midfielder Jucilei, who was bought for €10 million, Atletico Mineiro forward Diego Tardelli, who signed on a four-year contract, and Moroccan winger Mbark Boussoufa from Anderlecht. Anzhi paid €8 million for Boussoufa, and his transfer was finalised in the last minute of the window, on 10 March.

In summer 2011, the club signed Hungarian winger Balázs Dzsudzsák, who signed a four-year deal for a reported €14 million. Anzhi also bought Russian midfielder Yuri Zhirkov from Chelsea for a similar fee. On 23 August, Cameroonian striker Samuel Eto'o signed from Inter Milan for approximately €21 million on a world-record €20.5 million annual salary. The deal included a three-year-contract. On 30 August, Anzhi made their last big summer transfer window signing, with the arrival of Mehdi Carcela.

In September 2011, Gadzhi Gadzhiyev was sacked, after only managing one win in the last six matches, leaving the club seventh in the league table. Roberto Carlos took on a player-manager role, along with assistant Andrei Gordeyev. On 27 December 2011, the club appointed Yuri Krasnozhan as the new coach. However, he was sacked after only two months, and the team didn't play any official games under his management. In February 2012, experienced Dutchman Guus Hiddink was announced as his replacement. Hiddink's first signing was Congolese defender Christopher Samba, joining for £12 million from Blackburn Rovers on 24 February.

On 30 January 2012, Roberto Carlos announced his plans to retire at the end of the season, despite his contract running until June 2013. He ended his football career on 1 August and took up a role as the club's director. The Russian club concluded the first season after the takeover, the 2011–12 season, with a fifth-place finish in the league, which qualified the club for the Europa League second qualifying round. In the Russian Cup, the club was eliminated in the round of 16 with an extra time loss against Dynamo Moscow.

On 3 September 2012, the club signed Lassana Diarra on a four-year deal. On 10 October, Anzhi opened a youth academy, the first in Dagestan, in order to develop youth talents for the first team. The academy is being run by Anzhi Sporting Director Jelle Goes. On 2 February 2013, Willian joined the club from Shakhtar Donetsk for a €35 million fee.

Anzhi finished the 2012–13 season in third place in the league, missing out of qualification for next season's Champions League. In the Europa League, they finished second in their group, and were eliminated in the round of 16 by Newcastle United with a last minute goal after beating Hannover 96 in the round of 32. They reached the Russian Cup final that season, losing to CSKA on penalties.

On 22 July 2013, Hiddink resigned from his post as manager, ending an 18-month stint. His newly appointed assistant, countryman René Meulensteen, was promoted to the manager position. However, after 16 days as the team manager, Meulensteen was sacked.

Budget cuts
On 7 August 2013, Kerimov decided to reduce the team's annual budget by two-thirds. As a result, on 15 August 2013, Yuri Zhirkov, Igor Denisov, and Aleksandr Kokorin were packaged to Dynamo Moscow for an undisclosed fee. The three players had been purchased within the preceding two seasons, at a total cost exceeding €50 million. Remchukov said that the reason for the move was the "sharp deterioration in the health of Suleyman Kerimov, because of worries about the club's lack of success". In addition, Dynamo also signed Christopher Samba, Vladimir Gabulov and Aleksei Ionov from Anzhi. Other cost-cutting transfers included Samuel Eto'o and Willian to English side Chelsea; Lassana Diarra, Mbark Boussoufa and Arseniy Logashov to Lokomotiv Moscow; João Carlos to Spartak Moscow; and Oleg Shatov to Zenit Saint Petersburg. The firesale continued into January 2014 with the sale of striker Lacina Traoré to Monaco for €18 million and the sale of midfielder Jucilei to Emirati side Al-Jazira.

Several of the players sold had been recent signings for Anzhi; Aleksandr Kokorin had signed from Dynamo only a month before being sold back to the Dinamiki and had yet to make an appearance for Anzhi. Igor Denisov and Aleksei Ionov had both only signed in June and had played only a handful of matches before being sold. Christopher Samba had rejoined Anzhi in July after a spell with Queens Park Rangers. Willian had joined in January and played only 11 league matches before being sold.

The budget cuts and subsequent sales resulted in Anzhi performing very poorly in the 2013–14 Russian Premier League: they finished last and were relegated, having amassed a record low of three wins and 20 points, making them the worst last-placed team in Europe. However, they returned to the top division at the first attempt.

Although they were relegated, the club still managed to get into the last 16 of the Europa League, being eliminated by AZ Alkmaar.

Recent history
Yuri Semin was announced as Anzhi's manager on 18 June 2015, signing a one-year contract with the option of an additional year. After gaining only 6 points in first 10 games of the 2015–16 season and with Anzhi in last place, Semin left Anzhi on 29 September 2015. After Semin's departure, Ruslan Agalarov was placed in charge of the club, until the end of the season, saving them from relegation with a play-off victory over Volgar Astrakhan.

Pavel Vrba was appointed as the club's new manager on 30 June 2016, following the expiration of Ruslan Agalarov's contract on 31 May 2016. On 28 December 2016, Suleyman Kerimov sold the club to Osman Kadiyev, with Pavel Vrba leaving by mutual consent two days later, with Aleksandr Grigoryan being appointed as the club's new manager on 5 January 2017.

Anzhi was relegated from the Russian Premier League once again at the end of the 2017–18 season, losing the relegation playoffs to FC Yenisey Krasnoyarsk with an aggregate score of 4–6. On 13 June 2018, FC Amkar Perm announced that the Russian Football Union recalled their 2018–19 season license, making them ineligible for the Russian Premier League or Russian Football National League. As a consequence, Anzhi took Amkar's spot and was not relegated.

Anzhi struggled again during the 2018–19 season, and following a 0–1 defeat to Arsenal Tula, their relegation back to the Russian Football National League was confirmed.

On 15 May 2019, club's general director Absalutdin Agaragimov announced that the club failed Russian Football Union licensing for the 2019–20 season. The club had until the end of May to lodge an appeal. On 29 May 2019, Russian Football Union licensing department chief Yevgeni Letin announced that Anzhi has recalled their appeal and, as a result, will not compete in the second-tier Russian Football National League in the 2019–20 season. They had an option of applying for the third-tier Russian Professional Football League license or potentially declaring bankruptcy. On 26 June 2019, Anzhi confirmed that they had received a license to play in the Russian Professional Football League for the 2019–20 season, and that they were still unable to register new players due to outstanding debts. Their 2019–20 squad mostly included the under-20 players who played for their youth team in the previous season, with most first-team players moving to other professional teams, including several notable ones (Yury Dyupin, Vladislav Kulik, Andrés Ponce) who remained in the Russian Premier League.

On 3 June 2022, the Russian Football Union confirmed their decision to not grant Anzhi the license that is necessary to play in the FNL 2. Their appeal was not considered as it was not filed according to the procedure. That automatically meant the loss of professional status. The club issued a statement apologizing to the fans and stating hope that the club can come back "one day". The last game of the FNL2 season and the last professional Anzhi game was played on 5 June 2022, Anzhi won 4–0 away against FC Rotor-2 Volgograd. Another club based in Makhachkala, FC Dynamo Makhachkala, secured promotion to the FNL 3 days prior to that.

Crest and colours

The club's crest includes a yellow eagle in traditional Caucasian clothing with elements of the Dagestani flag.

The club's name derives from the word Anzhi which means "pearl" in the Kumyk language. It was also the ancient name for the land around where Makhachkala is situated.

In the 2013–14 season, they changed their kit sponsor from Adidas to Nike.

Stadium

Due to the risk of possible armed conflict in Dagestan, the club's players primarily live and train at a training base near Moscow, which was previously used by Saturn Moscow. The club fly in for home matches, which have a heavy security presence.

The club's 28,000-seat Anzhi Arena was built in 2003, and due to its facilities is not used in European competition, for which Anzhi use the Lokomotiv Stadium in Moscow. A high-priority goal of Kerimov when he purchased the club was the construction of a new 40,000 seater ground.

Supporters
Anzhi receive most of their support from the Northern Caucasian region, particularly from the city of Makhachkala. The club also enjoys support from fans scattered all over Dagestan, and the local area in general. The club is hated by some supporters of the Moscow-based clubs as well as Zenit Saint Petersburg, in part out of jealousy of the club's former wealth and also out of ethnic and religious animosity.

European competitions
Anzhi's first continental participation was in the 2001–02 UEFA Cup. Their opponents were Rangers of Scotland. Instead of usual home-and-away fixtures, UEFA decided to hold a single match in a neutral venue—the Polish Army Stadium in Warsaw—due to the unstable situation in neighbouring Chechnya. Rangers won the match 1–0 and eliminated Anzhi.

After finishing fifth in the 2011–12 Russian Premier League, Anzhi qualified for the group stage of the UEFA Europa League for the first time in the club's history, after eliminating Budapest Honvéd in the second qualifying round, Vitesse in the third qualifying round and AZ Alkmaar in the play-off round. However, they again had to play home matches away, this time at the Luzhniki Stadium, due to unrest in the city of Makhachkala. They finished second in group A behind Liverpool; both games between the two ended as 1–0 home wins. Liverpool, Anzhi and Young Boys took the top three positions in the group respectively with ten points each, and were ranked by their head-to-head record with fourth-placed Udinese; Anzhi were the only team in the group not to lose at home, having won all their home games in the group stage. Guus Hiddink's team were drawn with German side Hannover 96, who won group L. The Russians won the first leg 3–1 at the Luzhniki before a 1–1 draw in Hanover sent them through 4–2 on aggregate. They then faced Newcastle United in the next round, where Alan Pardew's men became the first team to deny Anzhi a home win in European competition. In the second leg away at St James' Park, Newcastle's Papiss Cissé headed home the winner in the last second to eliminate Anzhi; Mehdi Carcela-González had earlier been sent off for the club.

Record

1R: First round, 2Q: Second qualifying round, 3Q: Third qualifying round, PO: Play-off round

Notes
1 Only one leg was played, in a neutral venue in Warsaw, Poland, due to security concerns in Russia.

Honours
 Russian National League
 Champions (2): 1999, 2009

Recent seasons

Russia

Reserve teams

Records

Appearances

Top goalscorers

Top scorers by season

Notable players
Had international caps for their respective countries. Players whose name is listed in bold represented their countries while playing for Anzhi.

USSR/Russia

Former USSR countries

Europe

Africa

Asia

South America

Managers

  Vladimir Petrov (1993)
  Ahmad Alaskarov (1994)
  Aleksandr Markarov (interim) (1995)
  Eduard Malofeyev (1996–98)
  Aleksandr Reshetnyak (interim) (1998)
  Pyotr Shubin (1998)
  Gadzhi Gadzhiyev (1999–01)
  Aleksandr Markarov (interim) (2001)
  Leonid Tkachenko (2001–02)
  Myron Markevych (10 July 2002 – 10 Oct 2002)
  Aleksandr Piskaryov (2003)
  Aleksandr Reshetnyak (interim) (2003)
  Aleksandr Markarov (interim) (2003)
  Yevgeni Kuznetsov (2004)
  Aleksandr Reshetnyak (interim) (2004)
  Dmitri Galiamin (2004–06)
  Aleksandr Markarov (2006)
  Omari Tetradze (1 Jan 2007 – 14 March 2010)

Information correct as of match played 15 March 2020. Only competitive matches are counted.

Notes:

References

External links

Official website

 
Association football clubs established in 1991
Association football clubs disestablished in 2022
Anzhi Makhachkala
Anzhi Makhachkala
1991 establishments in Russia
2022 disestablishments in Russia